The International Search and Rescue Advisory Group (INSARAG) is a network of disaster-prone and disaster-responding countries and organizations dedicated to urban search and rescue (USAR) and operational field coordination.  It aims to establish standards and classification for international USAR teams as well as a methodology for international response coordination in the aftermath of earthquakes and collapsed structure disasters. The INSARAG Secretariat is located in the United Nations Office for the Coordination of Humanitarian Affairs (OCHA) at the Palais des Nations in Geneva.

History

INSARAG was established in 1991 following initiatives of international USAR teams that responded to the 1988 Armenia earthquake and the 1985 Mexico City earthquake. The United Nations was chosen as the INSARAG Secretariat to facilitate international participation and coordination. INSARAG Secretariat is hosted in the Emergency Response Section (ERS) of the Response Support Branch (RSB) (which was called in the past "Field Coordination Support Section of the Emergency Services Branch") of OCHA in Geneva.

INSARAG activities are guided by UN General Assembly Resolution 57/150 of 16 December 2002 on "Strengthening the Effectiveness and Coordination of International Urban Search and Rescue Assistance" and by the INSARAG Hyogo Declaration adopted at the first INSARAG Global Meeting in 2010 in Kobe, Japan.

INSARAG participated in relief efforts for the 2015 earthquake in Nepal.

INSARAG led the response to the 2023 earthquake in Turkey.

Mandate

The INSARAG Mandate entails:
 the development of effective international USAR procedures and operational standards,
 implementing the "Strengthening the Effectiveness" document,
 improving cooperation and coordination amongst international USAR teams at disaster sites,
 promoting activities to improve USAR preparedness in disaster-prone countries,
 development of standardized guidelines and procedures,
 sharing best practices amongst national and international USAR teams, and
 defining standards for minimum requirements of international USAR teams.

Membership 
Any country or organization with a stake in urban search and rescue may join INSARAG. Countries that wish to join identify a national focal point that acts as an interface with the INSARAG Regional Group and the Secretariat. Organizations wishing to join apply to the Secretariat through their national focal point. Member countries with USAR teams deploying internationally are strongly encouraged to apply for an INSARAG External Classification (IEC), however, this is not a requirement to be a member of INSARAG.

INSARAG members are part of a worldwide knowledge-sharing network on collapsed structure rescue and operational field coordination. They are invited to annual meetings of the relevant INSARAG Regional Group and to participate in INSARAG working groups.  The members are expected to have access to the Virtual OSOCC (Virtual On-Site Operations Coordination Centre) and the Global Disaster Alert and Coordination System (GDACS) on the internet, which provide alert notification in the event of a sudden-onset disaster and real-time information updates and coordination during ongoing disasters. The USAR Directory, managed by the INSARAG Secretariat, provides an overview of INSARAG member countries and their USAR teams.

Leadership

As of February 2023, the leadership was composed of a Secretary and regional sub-Secretaries, as follows:
 Sebastian Rhodes Stampa, Secretary of INSARAG
 Haruka Ezaki, INSARAG Secretariat Asia-Pacific
 Lucien Jaggi, INSARAG Secretariat Middle East and North Africa
 Clement Kalonga, INSARAG Secretariat Africa
 Ana Maria Rebaza, INSARAG Secretariat Americas
 Stefania Trassari, INSARAG Secretariat Europe and CIS

References

External links 
 INSARAG official website 

 INSARAG - USAR Directory
 What is INSARAG?

Organizations established by the United Nations
Organizations established in 1991
Rescue